Mansher "Joey" Singh OLY (born 1 December 1965 in Calcutta) is an Indian sport shooter who specializes in double trap and trap.

At the 2008 Olympic Games, he finished in first place in the trap qualification. He also came first at the 2004 Olympic Games. In addition, he has medals from the Asian Games and the Commonwealth Games. In the 1994 Commonwealth Games in Victoria, British Columbia, he won a gold medal in the trap event.

He also won the Arjuna Award in 1993.

Education
Singh graduated from St. Columba's School, Delhi in 1985, before studying at St. Stephen's College, Delhi.

Olympic Results

References

1965 births
Living people
Indian male sport shooters
Shooters at the 1984 Summer Olympics
Shooters at the 1996 Summer Olympics
Shooters at the 2004 Summer Olympics
Shooters at the 2008 Summer Olympics
Olympic shooters of India
Trap and double trap shooters
Recipients of the Arjuna Award
Shooters at the 2010 Commonwealth Games
Asian Games medalists in shooting
St. Columba's School, Delhi alumni
St. Stephen's College, Delhi alumni
Sportspeople from Kolkata
Shooters at the 1994 Asian Games
Shooters at the 1998 Asian Games
Shooters at the 2002 Asian Games
Shooters at the 2006 Asian Games
Shooters at the 2010 Asian Games
Shooters at the 2014 Asian Games
Commonwealth Games medallists in shooting
Commonwealth Games gold medallists for India
Commonwealth Games silver medallists for India
Sport shooters from Punjab, India
Asian Games silver medalists for India
Asian Games bronze medalists for India
Medalists at the 1998 Asian Games
Medalists at the 2002 Asian Games
Medalists at the 2006 Asian Games
Medalists at the 2010 Asian Games
Medallists at the 2010 Commonwealth Games